Danio sysphigmatus  is a species of Danio found Sittaung drainage and coastal rivers along the Tanintharyi coast in Myanmar.

References

Danio
Fish described in 2015